The 2008 AFC Futsal Championship was held in Bangkok, Thailand from 11 May to 18 May 2008. The tournament acted as a qualifying tournament for the 2008 FIFA Futsal World Cup in Brazil.

Qualification

Venues

Draw 
The draw for the 2008 AFC Futsal Championship was held on 11 April 2008 in Bangkok, Thailand.

Group stage

Group A

Group B

Group C

Group D

Knockout stage

Quarter-finals

Semi-finals

Third place play-off

Final

Awards 

 Most Valuable Player
 Vahid Shamsaei
 Top Scorer
 Vahid Shamsaei (13 goals)
 Fair-Play Award

 All-Star Team
 Mostafa Nazari (GK)
 Mohammad Taheri
 Daisuke Ono
 Panuwat Janta
 Vahid Shamsaei
Coach:  Hossein Shams (Iran)
 Reserve All-Star Team
 Zheng Tao and  Somkid Chuenta (GK)
 Mohammad Reza Heidarian
 Mohammad Keshavarz
 Lertchai Issarasuwipakorn
 Majid Latifi
Coach:  Farinha (China) and  Jose María Pazos (Thailand)

Goalscorers
13 goals
  Vahid Shamsaei

6 goals

  Ali Asghar Hassanzadeh
  Anucha Munjarern

5 goals

  Li Xin
  Majid Latifi
  Mohammad Taheri
  Yuki Kanayama
  Hurshid Tajibaev

4 goals

  Liang Shuang
  Liu Xinyi
  Wang Wei
  Mohammad Reza Heidarian
  Yusuke Inada
  Yusuke Komiyama
  Daisuke Ono
  Nurjan Djetybaev
  Khaled Takaji
  Panuwat Janta
  Panomkorn Saisorn
  Tanakorn Santanaprasit
  Farruh Farhutdinov

3 goals

  Lachlan Wright
  Christopher Zeballos
  Wu Zhuoxi
  Zhang Xi
  Zhang Xiao
  Majid Raeisi
  Mostafa Tayyebi
  Kenichiro Kogure
  Hayssam Atwi
  Nikolay Odushev
  Ilhom Yusupdjanov

2 goals

  Fernando
  Adrian Vizzari
  Chang Fu-hsiang
  Jaelani Ladjanibi
  Javad Asghari Moghaddam
  Mohammad Hashemzadeh
  Kazem Mohammadi
  Abdul-Karim Ghazi
  Talaibek Djumataev
  Mahmoud Itani
  Serge Said
  Muizzudin Mohd Haris
  Safar Mohamad
  Kang Hyun-uk
  Lee Jong-yun
  Shin Han-kook
  Firdavs Faizullaev
  Alisher Ulmasov
  Prasert Innui
  Ekkapong Suratsawang
  Mekan Muhamedmuradov
  Agajan Resulov
  Dilshod Irsaliev

1 goal

  Greg Giovenali
  Luke Haydon
  Hu Jie
  Li Jian
  Zhang Jiong
  Chen Chun-chieh
  Huang Shih-chan
  Fachry Assegaff
  Deny Handoyo
  Sayan Karmadi
  Topas Wiyantoro
  Mohammad Keshavarz
  Hashim Khalid
  Ali Saad
  Kenta Fujii
  Kotaro Inaba
  Takeshi Kishimoto
  Meshari Al-Nakkas
  Mohammad Al-Nagi
  Hamed Al-Otaibi
  Hamad Al-Othman
  Daniar Abdyraimov
  Marat Duvanaev
  Dilshat Kadyrov
  Emil Kanetov
  Evgeniy Malinin
  Azamat Mendibaev
  Mihail Sundeev
  Rabih Abou-Chaaya
  Abbas Fadlallah
  Ruzaley Abdul Aziz
  Ahmad Hanif Sarmin
  Addie Azwan Zainal
  Zaidi Zulkhapri
  Jung Hae-hyuck
  Jung Hyuk
  Kim In-woo
  Obidjon Ismoilov
  Sherzod Jumaev
  Sermphan Khumthinkaew
  Ekkapan Suratsawang
  Natthapon Suttiroj
  Ukrit Tangtung
  Ahmed Allaberdiyev
  Bayrammurat Esenmamedov
  Mergen Orazov
  Ildar Tashliyev
  Umid Holmatov
  Gulomjon Mamdjonov
  Shuhrat Tojiboev

Own goals

  Fang Ching-jen (for Australia)
  Lee Meng-chian (for Japan)
  Maulana Ihsan (for Thailand)
  Ali Saad (for Kyrgyzstan)
  Marat Duvanaev (for Japan)
  Rabih Abou-Chaaya (for South Korea)
  Zaidi Zulkhapri (for South Korea)
  Obidjon Ismoilov (for Iran)
  Bakhodur Sufiev (for Iran)

References

 Results
 Goalzz
 Official report

 

2008
2008 in Thai football
Championship
International futsal competitions hosted by Thailand
2008 in Bangkok
Sport in Bangkok